Benjamin Schöckel (born August 16, 1980 in Bad Neustadt an der Saale) is a German former footballer. He spent one season in the Bundesliga with FC Energie Cottbus.

References

1980 births
Living people
People from Bad Neustadt an der Saale
Sportspeople from Lower Franconia
German footballers
FC Bayern Munich II players
VfR Aalen players
FC Energie Cottbus players
SV Wehen Wiesbaden players
Bundesliga players
3. Liga players
Association football defenders
Footballers from Bavaria